= The Sluggard =

The Sluggard may refer to:

- a bronze statue of Giuseppe Valona, by Lord Frederic Leighton
- a moralistic poem by Isaac Watts: see wikisource:The Sluggard (Watts)
